Cave Companions or Ashab al-Kahf is The Most used front group by Iran-backed militias to conceal her involvement in military operations. Her first appearance was in 2019 It has remained constantly active ever since. The group claims responsibility for the attacks carried out by the factions. It has claimed responsibility for IED attacks on US convoys since March 2020, and at least one missile attack on the US Embassy on 17 November 2020.

Links to Asa'ib Ahl al-Haq 
The majority of evidence shows that "Cave Companions" is affiliated with Asa'ib Ahl al-Haq. Analysis of posts and accounts promoting the activity of "Cave Companions" the social media accounts linked to "Asa'ib Ahl al-Haq" seem to have a particularly close relationship with Them. The fact that the attacks claimed by the "Cave Companions" are carried out near the areas under the control of "Asa'ib Ahl al-Haq".

Name 
The group was named after the story of the Seven Sleepers In Arabic it is called "Cave Companions", The name was also derived from the fact that the group attacks targets and Then hides, And the cave is the meaning of its safe places.

Assassinations 
Several local media outlets accused Cave Companions of being involved in the assassination of civil activists and Critics of Iranian influence in Iraq during the 2019–2021 Iraqi protests.

Activities 

 On 25 December 2020, the "Cave Companions" group joined the fierce media campaign to release a member of "Asa'ib Ahl al-Haq", and issued statements confirming its willingness to take to the street if the leadership of "Asa'ib Ahl al-Haq" ordered to do so.
 In December 2020 and early January 2021, accounts linked to the group on social media published veiled criticism of the Kata'ib Hezbollah militia's strategy. This rift appeared to have ended on 6 January. while, "Cave Companions" changed its slogan to an image closer in style to other "resistance" groups.
 On 15 February 2021, "Cave Companions" claimed responsibility for missile attacks on Turkish forces in northern Iraq.

References 

Paramilitary forces of Iraq